Elizabeth Castillo (born ) is a retired Peruvian female volleyball player.

She was part of the Peru women's national volleyball team at the 1998 FIVB Volleyball Women's World Championship in Japan.

Career
Castillo won the 1995 South American Club Championship gold medal playing with the Peruvian club Juventus Sipesa.

References

External links
http://spanishdakota.weebly.com/author.html
http://stats.njcaa.org/sports/wvball/2004-05/div1/teams/MiamiDadeCollege/players/ElizabethCASTILLO.html

1975 births
Living people
Peruvian women's volleyball players
Place of birth missing (living people)
20th-century Peruvian women
21st-century Peruvian women